Keith Johns Allred (January 4, 1955-September 18, 2018) was an American Naval officer and Naval trial lawyer, beginning his career with the US Seventh Fleet aboard several Naval destroyers, from 1979-1982. From 1985, until his retirement in 2009, he oversaw the Western Pacific Judicial Circuit as a Circuit Trial Judge. He was also the presiding judge at the Guantanamo military commission where he notably oversaw the trial of Salim Hamdan.

Early life and career
Keith Johns Allred was born on January 4, 1955 in El Paso, Texas. Allred entered the Navy in 1979 after completing a Bachelor of Arts degree with High Honors at Brigham Young University. Initially assigned as a surface warfare officer, he served three years at sea aboard the destroyers USS Oldendorf (DD-972) and USS Towers (DDG-9), qualifying as a Command Duty Officer, Officer of the Deck at Sea, and Navigator, with much of his initial assignment forward deployed to the US Seventh Fleet, operating from the United States Fleet Activities Yokosuka base in Yokosuka, Japan westward to the Indian Ocean and Persian Gulf.

In 1982 he was selected for the highly competitive Law Education Program and accepted an offer to attend the University of Washington School of Law.
He received his Juris Doctor in 1985 from the University of Washington. He served in the U.S. Navy in various capacities: in 1995 as general counsel, Naval Medical Center San Diego; in 1999 as circuit trial judge, Western Pacific Judicial Circuit in Yokosuka, Japan; and in 2005 as senior trial judge, Western Judicial Circuit.

Allred passed away on September 18, 2018 in Tacoma, Washington.

Military career

Salim Ahmed Hamdan trial
On June 4, 2007, Allred dismissed all charges against Salim Ahmed Hamdan. Hamdan had been one of the first four Guantanamo captives to face charges before a military commission.
It was Hamdan's habeas corpus request, Hamdan v. Rumsfeld, that resulted in the United States Supreme Court ruling that the first version of the Guantanamo military commissions were unconstitutional.

The United States Congress, which the Supreme Court had ruled did have the constitutional authority to institute military commissions passed the Military Commissions Act in the fall of 2006.

Allred, and Peter Brownback, the officer presiding over Omar Khadr's Tribunal, ruled that the since the Act only authorized the Commissions to try "unlawful enemy combatants", and that Hamdan and Khadr's Combatant Status Review Tribunals had merely confirmed that the captives were "enemy combatants", the Commissions lacked jurisdiction.

See also
Military Police: Enemy Prisoners of War, Retained Personnel, Civilian Internees and Other Detainees

References

1955 births
2018 deaths
Guantanamo Military Commission members
University of Washington School of Law alumni
Brigham Young University alumni
People from El Paso, Texas